Vizafogó is a part of the 13th district of Budapest. It lies between the Danube and Váci út, extending to Dráva Street in the south and Meder Street in the north.

History
The part north of the Árpád Bridge is protected by a dam built between The Dráva and the mouth of the Rákos Stream. It was constructed between 1870 and 1878, and by the end of the 19th century a significant industrial area had developed with numerous factories, steam mills and other plants.  The area of today's Árpád Bridge overpass was the site of the Zarzetzky match factory, and to the north of it the factories founded by László Láng, which were later merged under the name of the Láng Machine Factory. Turbina Street, located here, was originally called László Láng Street.
By the beginning of the 20th century, the shrubby Danube bank had been filled in. In the Rákos-patak area, the Vuk and Sons Sawmill was located on the site of the present-day sewage treatment plant. In the 1930s, the police houses were built in Dagály Street.  The Dagály fürdő Szabadság Strandfürdő (Freedom Beach Bath) was opened in 1948. Since then, it has been renovated several times. Opposite it, from 1961, were the grounds of the Forestry and Pipe fitting SC respectively. On the northern side of the road leading to Árpád Bridge, further all-comfort cooperative houses were built between 1961-1966. In 2006, a housing estate was built on the western part of the Erdért track, reducing the green character of the area. On the eastern side, around 1977, a tennis hall was built on the site of the handball court. The rear premises of the Láng Machine Works and the premises of the MHSZ are located towards Váci út from the pitches. 

South of the Árpád Bridge to Dráva Street, along the siding that used to serve the Vizafogó freight station, a slum, along Váci út, the Hétház and Tirirzáhár houses were home to working-class families. From 1940 on the west side of the railway line, a gypsy settlement was established up to Népfürdő Street.The Council of Public Works of Budapest drew up the first proposal for the settlement of the area in 1938, which also took into account the abolition of the railway station here. Between 1970-1976, the site along Párkány Street was redeveloped, and between 1982-1984, the first phase of the Vizafogó residential estate was built on the eastern side of the Budapest Metro, based on the designs of László Bene and Ferenc Szentmártoni. The ten-story buildings, constructed using the technology of a building factory, were home to 2,684 apartments. In addition, a 16-room school, a 200-seat kindergarten, a 100-seat crèche and the present building of the Berzsenyi Dániel Gymnasium were built on the site, along with commercial units and a pharmacy. From 1987 onwards, the second phase was built on the site of the freight station, which was completed by 1989. The station building was renovated and is still standing today.

In the north-western part of the site is the Marina Beach, which began construction in the early 2000s. The 2017 World Aquatics Championships led to the construction of the Danube Arena in the Freedom Beach Bath area, which was associated with the renewal of a large part of the Danube promenade in the district, which was named Moscow Promenade.

Before the Regime Change, the River Regulation and Gravel Dredging Company operated a plant around the artificial Danube bay between the Marina shore and the mouth of the Rákos stream. Today, it functions as a motorboat and small boat harbor.

In January 2021, a large park in Vizafogó near the Árpád Bridge was announced for construction. Construction officially began on June 21 of the same year, and was open to the public on March 8, 2022.

References 

Budapest metropolitan area